Vera Sychugova (born October 16, 1963), also known as Vera Zaytseva, was a professional sprinter from Russia. She won a silver medal in the 4x400m at the 1993 World Championships in Athletics by virtue of running for her team in the preliminary rounds. Her personal best for 400m was 51.64 seconds, set in Tallinn, Estonia on July 5, 1988.

At the 1994 European Cup in Athletics, Sychugova ran the entire second leg of a 4x400m relay in her lane rather than cutting in to the track to save distance as IAAF rules permit. As a result of this mistake, her Russian team lost their lead to Britain and ultimately finished third.

References 

Living people
1963 births
Russian female sprinters
World Athletics Championships athletes for Russia